Allocnemis abbotti, formerly Chlorocnemis abbotti, is a species of white-legged damselfly in the family Platycnemididae. It is found in Kenya, Malawi, and Tanzania. Its natural habitats are subtropical or tropical moist lowland forests, rivers, intermittent rivers, and freshwater springs. It is threatened by habitat loss.

The IUCN conservation status of Allocnemis abbotti is "NT", near threatened. The species may be considered threatened in the near future. The IUCN status was reviewed in 2010.

References

Further reading

 

Platycnemididae
Articles created by Qbugbot
Insects described in 1896